Randy C. Hoback  (born December 19, 1967) is a Canadian politician who was elected to represent the electoral district of Prince Albert in the 2008 Canadian federal election. He is a member of the Conservative Party. He was subsequently re-elected in the 2011, 2015, and 2019 federal elections.

Hoback has a business administration certificate from the University of Saskatchewan and Chartered Director's designation from McMaster University and the Conference Board of Canada.

Hoback worked for farm machinery manufacturer Flexicoil and later Case New Holland from 1986 to 2000, when he purchased the family farm in 2000. He was nominated for the Saskatchewan Outstanding Young Farmer Award in 2005.

Hoback served as chairman of the Western Canadian Wheat Growers Association (WCWGA), and represented them at World Trade Organization meetings in Geneva and Hong Kong.

As an MP, Hoback was a member of the Standing Committee on Procedure and House Affairs, a member of the Standing Committee on Agriculture and Agri-food, and the Standing Committee on Finance. On Oct. 16, 2014, he became chair of the Standing Committee on International Trade - a post he held until the 2015 federal election. He also served as the chair of the Saskatchewan Conservative Caucus and as the Vice Chair of the Standing Committee on International Trade.

In 2010, he was elected as chair of the Canadian Section of ParlAmericas, an organization committed to promoting parliamentary participation in the inter-American system, developing inter-parliamentary dialogue on issues of importance to the hemisphere, and encouraging the sharing of experiences and best practices amongst its members. It also works to strengthen the role of legislatures in democratic development, and promotes the harmonization of legislation and hemispheric integration as instruments of sustainable and harmonious development. In February 2011, Hoback was elected President of ParlAmericas at the Association's 8th Annual FIPA-Parlamericas meeting in Asuncion, Paraguay. He now serves as the organization's Past-President.

During the 43rd Canadian Parliament, he introduced one private member bill, Bill C-234, An Act to amend the Income Tax Act (home security measures) which sought to create federal tax credit for making an expense to acquire, install, or maintain a security system installed in a dwelling or accessory building. It was brought to a vote on June 9, 2021, but defeated with only Conservatives Party members voting in favour. In the 2020 Conservative Party of Canada leadership election he endorsed Peter MacKay.

Born in Prince Albert, Saskatchewan, Hoback is married with two children.

Electoral record

References

External links
Official website
Randy Hoback, Conservative

1967 births
Conservative Party of Canada MPs
Living people
Members of the House of Commons of Canada from Saskatchewan
Politicians from Prince Albert, Saskatchewan
University of Saskatchewan alumni
21st-century Canadian politicians